Edgemont is an unincorporated community and census-designated place (CDP) in Cleburne County, Arkansas, United States. Edgemont has a post office with ZIP code 72044.

It was first listed as a CDP in the 2020 census with a population of 56.

Education 
Public education for elementary and secondary students is provided by West Side School District, which operates West Side Elementary School and West Side High School located in Greers Ferry.

Demographics

2020 census

Note: the US Census treats Hispanic/Latino as an ethnic category. This table excludes Latinos from the racial categories and assigns them to a separate category. Hispanics/Latinos can be of any race.

References

Unincorporated communities in Cleburne County, Arkansas
Unincorporated communities in Arkansas
Census-designated places in Cleburne County, Arkansas
Census-designated places in Arkansas